Michael Henry Peppiatt (born 9 October 1941) is an English art historian, curator and writer.

Biography
Son of Edward George Peppiatt (died 1983), B.Sc, ARCS, of Silver Birches, Stocking Pelham, near Buntingford, Hertfordshire, technical and production director for a pharmaceutical manufacturing company, and Elsa Eugénie (née Schlaich; died 1997).

Education and career 
Michael Peppiatt studied at Brentwood School, Essex, at the University of Göttingen, and at Trinity Hall, Cambridge (BA 1964, MA 1985, PhD) and subsequently joined The Observer as a junior art critic. He then went to Paris to take up an editorial job at Réalités magazine, where he remained until 1969, when he was appointed arts editor at Le Monde. In the mid-1970s he began reporting on cultural events across Europe for The New York Times and The Financial Times, becoming Paris correspondent for several art magazines, notably Art News and Art International. In 1985, Peppiatt became owner and editor of Art International, which he relaunched from Paris, devoting special issues to the artists he most admired.

In 1994, Peppiatt returned to London with his wife, the art historian Jill Lloyd, and their two children, where he wrote the biography of Francis Bacon (1909–1992), whose close friend and commentator he had been for thirty years. Chosen as a "Book of the Year" by The New York Times and translated into several languages, the biography is considered the definitive account of Bacon's life and work.

Peppiatt has curated numerous exhibitions worldwide, notably travelling retrospectives of the School of London, Francis Bacon, Alberto Giacometti, Christian Schad and Antoni Tàpies.  In 2009, Peppiatt curated an exhibition of sculpture by Dado for the Venice Biennale, a Maillol retrospective for Barcelona, and a Caravaggio-Bacon exhibit for the Galleria Borghese in Rome.

In 2005, Peppiatt was awarded a Ph.D by the University of Cambridge for his publications on 20th-century art. He is a member of the Society of Authors and the Royal Society of Literature, and since 2010 he has been on the board of the Palazzo delle Esposizioni in Rome.

In 2012, Peppiatt published Interviews with Artists, a book of more than forty interviews with personalities ranging from Jean Dubuffet, Balthus, and Oscar Niemeyer to Brassai, Henri Cartier-Bresson, and Antoni Tàpies. An exhibition on this theme was shown at Eykyn Maclean in London.

Peppiatt curated a Miró exhibition that travelled from the Bucerius Kunst Forum in Hamburg to the Kunstsammlung, Düsseldorf, in 2014–15. Peppiatt's latest memoir, Francis Bacon in Your Blood, was published by Bloomsbury in August 2015. In 2018, Peppiatt curated the exhibition Bacon/Giacometti at the Beyeler Foundation, Switzerland. In 2022, Peppiatt curated the exhibition, Francis Bacon: Man and Beast, at the Royal Academy of Arts, London. The exhibition charts the development of Bacon's work through the lens of his fascination with animals and its impact on his treatment of the human figure.

Peppiatt has completed a new memoir about his life in Paris from the 1960s onwards, to be published by Bloomsbury.

Peppiatt serves on the advisory council of the UK Friends of the National Museum of Women in the Arts.

Bibliography
1964: Modern Art in Britain
1976: Francis Bacon: l’art de l’impossible (trans. with Michel Leiris)
1983: Imagination’s Chamber: Artists and their Studios (with Alice Bellony Rewald)
1987: The School of London
1997: Francis Bacon: Anatomy of an Enigma
2000: Zoran Music
2001: Alberto Giacometti in Post-War Paris
2002: Aristide Maillol
2003: Christian Schad and the Neue Sachlichkeit (ed. with Jill Lloyd)
2003: Dans l’atelier de Giacometti
2003: Vincent van Gogh
2004: Francis Bacon: le sacré et le profane
2006: L’amitié Leiris-Bacon: Une étrange fascination
2006: Francis Bacon in the 1950s
2006: Les dilemmes de Jean Dubuffet
2007: Van Gogh and Expressionism (ed. with Jill Lloyd)
2008 Francis Bacon in the 1950s
2008: Francis Bacon: Studies for a Portrait
2008: Francis Bacon: Anatomy of an Enigma (revised edition)
2009: Caravaggio/Bacon
2010: In Giacometti's Studio
2010: Alberto Giacometti: An Intimate Portrait
2012: Interviews with Artists (1966–2012)
2013: Giacometti and Sartre: A Double Portrait
2014: Art Plural: Voices of Contemporary Art
2014: Henri Cartier-Bresson
2014: Joan Miró: A Painter among Poets
2015: Francis Bacon In Your Blood: A Memoir
2017: David Hockney, Souvenirs
2019: The Existential Englishman
2020: The Making of Modern Art: Selected Essays
2021: Francis Bacon: Studies for a Portrait (revised and enlarged edition)
2021: Conversations avec Adrian Ghenie
2021: Bacon/Giacometti: A Dialogue
2021: Francis Bacon: Man and Beast
2021: Only Too Much Is Enough: Francis Bacon In His Own Words

References

1941 births
Living people
Alumni of Trinity Hall, Cambridge
English art critics
English art historians
The New York Times writers